Llwynda-Ddu Camp, also known as Llwynda-Ddu Hillfort, is a small Iron Age earthwork in Pentyrch, Cardiff in South Wales. The site is a scheduled monument, described as a prehistoric, defensive hillfort.

The ground falls away sharply on all sides except the eastern end. The entrance is at the smaller south-western end.

The camp probably comprised two ramparts with ditches but much of the outer ring has been destroyed. The entrance is a straight causeway which interrupts the inner and outer rings. The height of the bank is approximately  higher than the ditch bottom.

The site has been cultivated, with a modern dwelling nearby. It is suggested that the camp belonged to the Silures.

References

External links
 aerial view of camp from the north west

Hillforts in Cardiff
Scheduled monuments in Cardiff